Chebotarev's density theorem in algebraic number theory describes statistically the splitting of primes in a given Galois extension K of the field  of rational numbers. Generally speaking, a prime integer will factor into several ideal primes in the ring of algebraic integers of K. There are only finitely many patterns of splitting that may occur. Although the full description of the splitting of every prime p in a general Galois extension is a major unsolved problem, the Chebotarev density theorem says that the frequency of the occurrence of a given pattern, for all primes p less than a large integer N, tends to a certain limit as N goes to infinity.

1/n

among all primes. More generally, splitting behavior can be specified by assigning to (almost) every prime number an invariant, its Frobenius element, which is a representative of a well-defined conjugacy class in the Galois group 

Gal(K/Q).

Then the theorem says that the asymptotic distribution of these invariants is uniform over the group, so that a conjugacy class with k elements occurs with frequency asymptotic to 

k/n.

History and motivation 

When Carl Friedrich Gauss first introduced the notion of complex integers Z[i], he observed that the ordinary prime numbers may factor further in this new set of integers.  In fact, if a prime p is congruent to 1 mod 4, then it factors into a product of two distinct prime gaussian integers, or "splits completely"; if p is congruent to 3 mod 4, then it remains prime, or is "inert"; and if p is 2 then it becomes a product of the square of the prime (1+i) and the invertible gaussian integer -i; we say that 2 "ramifies". For instance, 

  splits completely;
  is inert;
  ramifies.

From this description, it appears that as one considers larger and larger primes, the frequency of a prime splitting completely approaches 1/2, and likewise for the primes that remain primes in Z[i]. Dirichlet's theorem on arithmetic progressions demonstrates that this is indeed the case. Even though the prime numbers themselves appear rather erratically, splitting of the primes in the extension 

 

follows a simple statistical law.

Similar statistical laws also hold for splitting of primes in the cyclotomic extensions, obtained from the field of rational numbers by adjoining a primitive root of unity of a given order. For example, the ordinary integer primes group into four classes, each with probability 1/4, according to their pattern of splitting in the ring of integers corresponding to the 8th roots of unity. 
In this case, the field extension has degree 4 and is abelian, with the Galois group isomorphic to the Klein four-group. It turned out that the Galois group of the extension plays a key role in the pattern of splitting of primes. Georg Frobenius established the framework for investigating this pattern and proved a special case of the theorem. The general statement was proved by Nikolai Grigoryevich Chebotaryov in 1922.

Relation with Dirichlet's theorem 

The Chebotarev density theorem may be viewed as a generalisation of Dirichlet's theorem on arithmetic progressions. A quantitative form of Dirichlet's theorem states that if N≥2 is an integer and a is coprime to N, then the proportion of the primes p congruent to a mod N is asymptotic to 1/n, where n=φ(N) is the Euler totient function. This is a special case of the Chebotarev density theorem for the Nth cyclotomic field K. Indeed, the Galois group of K/Q is abelian and can be canonically identified with the group of invertible residue classes mod N. The splitting invariant of a prime p not dividing N is simply its residue class because the number of distinct primes into which p splits is φ(N)/m, where m is multiplicative order of p modulo N; hence by the Chebotarev density theorem, primes are asymptotically uniformly distributed among different residue classes coprime to N.

Formulation

In their survey article,  give an earlier result of Frobenius in this area. Suppose K is a Galois extension of the rational number field Q, and P(t) a monic integer polynomial such that K is a splitting field of P. It makes sense to factorise P modulo a prime number p. Its 'splitting type' is the list of degrees of irreducible factors of P mod p, i.e. P factorizes in some fashion over the prime field Fp. If n is the degree of P, then the splitting type is a partition Π of n. Considering also the Galois group G of K over Q, each g in G is a permutation of the roots of P in K; in other words by choosing an ordering of α and its algebraic conjugates, G is faithfully represented as a subgroup of the symmetric group Sn. We can write g by means of its cycle representation, which gives a 'cycle type' c(g), again a partition of n.

The theorem of Frobenius states that for any given choice of Π the primes p for which the splitting type of P mod p is Π has a natural density δ, with δ equal to the proportion of g in G that have cycle type Π.

The statement of the more general Chebotarev theorem is in terms of the Frobenius element of a prime (ideal), which is in fact an associated conjugacy class C of elements of the Galois group G. If we fix C then the theorem says that asymptotically a proportion |C|/|G| of primes have associated Frobenius element as C. When G is abelian the classes of course each have size 1. For the case of a non-abelian group of order 6 they have size 1, 2 and 3, and there are correspondingly (for example) 50% of primes p that have an order 2 element as their Frobenius. So these primes have residue degree 2, so they split into exactly three prime ideals in a degree 6 extension of Q with it as Galois group.

Statement
Let L be a finite Galois extension of a number field K with Galois group G. Let X be a subset of G that is stable under conjugation. The set of primes v of K that are unramified in L and whose associated Frobenius conjugacy class Fv is contained in X has density

The statement is valid when the density refers to either the natural density or the analytic density of the set of primes.

Effective Version
The Generalized Riemann hypothesis implies an effective version of the Chebotarev density theorem: if L/K is a finite Galois extension with Galois group G, and C a union of conjugacy classes of G, the number of unramified primes of K of norm below x with Frobenius conjugacy class in C is

where the constant implied in the big-O notation is absolute, n is the degree of L over Q, and Δ its discriminant.

The effective form of Chebotarev's density theory becomes much weaker without GRH. Take L to be a finite Galois extension of Q with Galois group G and degree d. Take  to be a nontrivial irreducible representation of G of degree n, and take  to be the Artin conductor of this representation.

The implicit constant of this  expression is absolute.

Infinite extensions
The statement of the Chebotarev density theorem can be generalized to the case of an infinite Galois extension L / K that is unramified outside a finite set S of primes of K (i.e. if there is a finite set S of primes of K such that any prime of K not in S is unramified in the extension L / K). In this case, the Galois group G of L / K is a profinite group equipped with the Krull topology. Since G is compact in this topology, there is a unique Haar measure μ on G. For every prime v of K not in S there is an associated Frobenius conjugacy class Fv. The Chebotarev density theorem in this situation can be stated as follows:

Let X be a subset of G that is stable under conjugation and whose boundary has Haar measure zero. Then, the set of primes v of K not in S such that Fv ⊆ X has density

This reduces to the finite case when L / K is finite (the Haar measure is then just the counting measure).

A consequence of this version of the theorem is that the Frobenius elements of the unramified primes of L are dense in G.

Important consequences
The Chebotarev density theorem reduces the problem of classifying Galois extensions of a number field to that of describing the splitting of primes in extensions. Specifically, it implies that as a Galois extension of K, L is uniquely determined by the set of primes of K that split completely in it. A related corollary is that if almost all prime ideals of K split completely in L, then in fact L = K.

See also 

 Splitting of prime ideals in Galois extensions
 Grothendieck–Katz p-curvature conjecture

Notes

References

		

Theorems in algebraic number theory
Analytic number theory